Beatriz Clara Coya (1556-1600), was a princess of the Inca Empire.

She was born to Sapa Inca Sayri Túpac (r 1545–1561) and Cusi Huarcay.

She married Martín García Óñez de Loyola and was the mother of Ana María de Loyola Coya.

References

 Sánchez, Luis Alberto: La literatura peruana. Derrotero para una historia cultural del Perú, tomo I. Cuarta edición y definitiva. Lima, P. L. Villanueva Editor, 1975.

Inca royalty
1556 births
Indigenous people of the Andes
1600 deaths